Hi-Tech Medical College & Hospital (HMCH) is a  private, profit, self-financing medical institution based in Bhubaneswar, Odisha, India. Hi-Tech Medical College & Hospital is functioning from 2005 under Utkal University affiliation and recognized by Medical Council Of India. It is Odisha's first private medical college. It has 400 Teaching beds with operation theatres along with 20 intensive care beds with 24hrs with trauma care facility. College offers MBBS and BDS course for duration of 5 years and also Post Graduation for duration of 3 years.

Location
It is located at Pandara, Rasulgarh. About 2 kilometres from National Highway.

References

Universities and colleges in Bhubaneswar
Science and technology in Bhubaneswar
Medical colleges in Odisha
Utkal University
2005 establishments in Orissa
Educational institutions established in 2005